The Heartstrings World Tour is the twelfth concert tour (and third world-tour) by British-Australian pop singer Olivia Newton-John. It began in 2002 and went through until 2005, with shows in North America, Australia and Japan during that time, she supported the three Newton-John albums (2), Indigo: Women of Song, and Stronger Than Before.

Background
The tour began in September 2002 in Canada and had ten legs, eight North American, one Australian, and one Japanese. In November 2005, Newton-John had finished his tour in the United States, were a total of 178 shows, her largest tour to date. Her daughter Chloe Lattanzi has participated in various shows.

Setlist

Tour dates

Festivals and other miscellaneous performances

Cancellations and rescheduled shows

Personnel
Andy Timmons – Guitar & Vocals
Dan Wojciechowski – Drums
Lee Hendricks – Bass
Catherine Marx – Keyboards
Warren Ham – Horns & Vocals
Steve Real – Vocals
Marlén Landin – Vocals  
Carmella Ramsey – Vocals

References

Olivia Newton-John concert tours
2002 concert tours
2003 concert tours
2004 concert tours
2005 concert tours